The 2012–13 Faysal Bank T20 Cup was the ninth season of the Faysal Bank T20 Cup in Pakistan, which was held from 1 to 9 December 2012. The winning team will receive Rs 20 million as prize money and while the runners-up will receive Rs 10 million.
This was also the last tournament played and was replaced with the Pakistan Super League.

News
 15 November: Pakistan Cricket Board denied Umar Akmal, Saeed Ajmal and Shahid Afridi permission to play in the season's Big Bash League, the Australia Twenty20 league, to ensure the trio's participation in Faysal Bank T20 Cup.
 17 November: Shahid Afridi is a fine player and has performed well in the past, but the upcoming Faysal Bank T20 Cup is the opportunity for him to perform and we will watch him – Pakistan chief selector Iqbal Qasim.
 19 November: Pakistan Cricket Board granted Saeed Ajmal, Shahid Afridi and Umar Akmal permission to play a few games at the Big Bash League, on the request of Cricket Australia. The trio were to miss the last round of Faysal Bank T20 Cup.
 19 November: Shahid Afridi, the Pakistan allrounder, has said he will not play for Sydney Thunder despite being given permission by Pakistan Cricket Board to take part in Australia's Big Bash League. Afridi said he wanted to play in Faysal Bank T20 Cup instead and that clashes with Australia's Twenty20 competition.
 20 November: Famous all-rounder Azhar Mahmood now will lead Islamabad Leopards in order to get a position in the national team of Pakistan for the tour of India. Azhar Mahmood had not played in any league of Pakistan since October 2010. He had played in many T20 leagues all over the world like the Indian Premier League, Bangladesh Premier League, Friends Life t20, HRV Cup, Sri Lanka Premier League and Champions League Twenty20.
 21 November: Test cricketer Hasan Raza was debarred from leading Karachi Zebras for the domestic season, but he could represent his team as the inquiry committee which took the decision failed to find any substance in the allegations of match-fixing against him and his team Karachi Zebras during the 2012 Faysal Bank Super Eight T20 Cup. Danish Kaneria was also not be able to lead Karachi Zebras this year due to his spot fixing ban. Rameez Raja is mostly confident for captaining the team Karachi Zebras.
 21 November: Lahore Regional Cricket Association named Mohammad Yousuf as the Lahore Lions captain and also requested Pakistan Cricket Board to review its one-year ban on left-arm fast-bowler Emmad Ali so that he could be possibly be included in the T20 squads. Pakistan's T20 captain Mohammad Hafeez will be featuring in the Lahore Lions instead of Faisalabad Wolves.
 24 November: Pakistan Cricket Board (PCB) has decided to set arena for Pakistan's domestic Twenty20 tournament in Lahore instead of Karachi because of the volatile situation in city which was scheduled to be played between 2 and 10 December. The tournament will now be played in three different grounds of Lahore which includes Gaddafi Stadium, Bagh-e-Jinnah and Lahore City Cricket Association Ground.
 28 November: The Faysal Bank T20 Cup will begin on 1 December and its final will be on 9 December. Bahawalpur Stags is the new team in the T20 competition.
 30 November: Pakistan Cricket Board is introducing in-competition dope testing during the Faysal Bank T20 Cup in order to strive for drug-free sports and to protect the basic framework for the athletes, the board said in a statement. Cricketers from all the regional teams participating in Faysal Bank T20 Cup will randomly be picked for dope testing. "These tests will be conducted by WADA-accredited independent doping control officers throughout the competition.
 1 December: Mohammad Yousuf, the former Pakistan batsman, has passed on the captaincy of the Lahore Lions team to Mohammad Hafeez, the national team's T20 captain, for the ongoing Faysal Bank T20 Cup to help the latter gain experience.

Teams

Venues

Fixtures and results 
All times shown are in Pakistan Standard Time (UTC+05).

Group stage

Group A
Points Table

Group B
Points Table

Knockout stage

Semi-finals

Final

Statistics
The tables below show the top five holders for each class of record. If the fifth place is shared then all holders are shown.  Last updated on 10 December 2012

High Scores (balls played)

Most runs (innings played)

Most fifties (innings played)

Most Sixes (in an inning)

Most Sixes (innings played)

Highest strike rates

Best Bowling (overs)

Most Wickets (innings played)

Best economy (Minimum five overs)

Highest Team Totals (overs)

Highest Match aggregates (overs)

Media Coverage

Sponsors
 PCB
 Faysal Bank
 Fly Emirates
 Haier Inspired Living
 Advance Telecom
 Easypaisa
 Medicam Toothpaste

See also
 Pakistani cricket team in India in 2012–13
 Faysal Bank T20 Cup
 Pakistan Super League T20
 Champions League Twenty20
 Faysal Bank Super Eight T20 Cup
 Twenty20 Cricket
 2012–13 Big Bash League
 President's Trophy 2012–13
 Quaid-e-Azam Trophy 2012–13
 Faysal Bank One Day Cup 2012–13

References

External links
 Tournament Site on PTV Sports
 Tournament Site on ESPN Cricinfo
 Tournament Site on Cricket Archive
 Tournament Site on PCB Official Website
 Tournament Site on Cricket Highlights 

2012 in Pakistani cricket
2012-2013 National T20 Cup
Domestic cricket competitions in 2012–13
2013 in Pakistani cricket
Pakistani cricket seasons from 2000–01